Rhymney railway station serves the town of Rhymney in Wales. The station has sidings to the west of its single platform which are used for the overnight stabling of the diesel multiple unit trains

History

The railway south from here was opened by the Rhymney Railway in 1858 as far as Hengoed and Walnut Tree Junction (giving access to  via the Taff Vale Railway by 1864), with a link northwards to Rhymney Bridge (on the Merthyr to Abergavenny 'Heads of the Valley' line) following in 1871. This was operated jointly with the London and North Western Railway. In the same year the current route through  was opened by the Rhymney company, removing the need for its trains to use TVR metals to reach Cardiff. Services to the north ended in 1953 with the closure of the joint line to Rhymney Bridge to passenger traffic (with complete closure following in November 1954). This remained intact but disused for many years, but was demolished in 2007 when the stabling sidings were relaid and re-aligned.

Services
On Mondays to Saturdays there is an hourly service from Rhymney to Penarth at xx29 every hour calling at Pontlottyn, Tir-Phil, Brithdir, Bargoed, Pengam, Hengoed, Ystrad Mynach, Llanbradach, Energlyn & Churchill Park, Aber, Caerphilly, Lisvane and Thornhill, Llanishen, Heath High Level, Cardiff Queen Street, Cardiff Central, Grangetown, Dingle Road and Penarth. Journeys to Cardiff take (on average) 55–60 minutes and 75 minutes to Penarth.

However a lack of rolling stock has prevented this taking placed as originally planned and the frequency will remain hourly (with additional weekday peak departures) for the immediate future.

Notes

External links

RAILSCOT - Photographs of Rhymney

Railway stations in Caerphilly County Borough
DfT Category F1 stations
Former Rhymney Railway stations
Railway stations in Great Britain opened in 1858
Railway stations served by Transport for Wales Rail